An absorbable gelatin sponge is a sterile hemostatic agent composed of purified porcine-derived gelatin. In regional chemotherapy, absorbable gelatin sponge may be used to embolize arteries in the region of a tumor in order to block or retard blood flow; this blockage results in a locally increased concentration of chemotherapeutic agents delivered to the tumor when chemotherapeutic agents are infused into the embolized arterial circulation upstream of the blockage. It is sometimes soaked with buprenorphine. It is placed directly on the wound's base and helps create a clot in the blood. To cover it and keep it in place, another bandage is placed on top of the dressing.

References

Further reading
 

Antihemorrhagics